Nathanaele Koll (born 4 April 1992), known professionally as Nathan Trent, is an Austrian singer. He represented Austria in the Eurovision Song Contest 2017 with the song "Running on Air" finishing in 16th place.

Career

2016–present: Eurovision Song Contest
Trent was born in Innsbruck, Austria, to an Austrian father and an Italian mother. On 18 June 2016, Trent released his debut single "Like It Is". On 19 December 2016, Trent was announced as the Austrian representative in the Eurovision Song Contest 2017. His song, "Running on Air", was released on 28 February 2017. At the time of his selection as the Austrian entrant, Trent was one of the 33 artists that had been shortlisted in Unser Song 2017, the contest to select the German entrant in the Eurovision Song Contest 2017. He was automatically eliminated, as a performer can not represent more than one country in the same year by European Broadcasting Union regulations. He ultimately finished 16th in the contest, with 93 points.

Discography

Studio albums

Singles

As lead artist

As featured artist

Television

References

1992 births
Living people
Musicians from Innsbruck
Austrian pop singers
English-language singers from Austria
21st-century Austrian male singers
Eurovision Song Contest entrants for Austria
Eurovision Song Contest entrants of 2017
Austrian singer-songwriters
Austrian people of Italian descent